The Manda Formation (also known as the Manda Beds) is a Middle Triassic (Anisian?) or possibly Late Triassic (Carnian?) geologic formation in Tanzania. It preserves fossils of many terrestrial vertebrates from the Triassic, including some of the earliest dinosauromorph archosaurs. The formation is often considered to be Anisian in age according to general tetrapod biochronology hypotheses and correlations to the Cynognathus Assemblage Zone of South Africa. However, some recent studies cast doubt to this age, suggesting that parts deposits may actually be younger (Carnian) in age.

History of study 
One of the first to study rocks of the Manda Formation was British geologist G. M. Stockley. In 1932, Stockley explored the geology of the Ruhuhu Basin in Tanzania. He called a series of layers dating from the Late Carboniferous to the Middle Triassic the Songea Series and divided it into eight units labelled K1-K8. Stockley was also the first to describe fossils from these rocks, naming an older layer the "Lower Bone Bed" and a younger layer the "Upper Bone Bed".

In 1957, paleontologist Alan J. Charig described many more fossils from the bone beds in his Ph.D. thesis for the University of Cambridge. Charig renamed the youngest of Stockley's units in 1963, calling unit K6 the Kawinga Formation, K7 the Kingori Sandstones, and K8 the Manda Formation. Fossils were identified in many strata, invalidating Stockley's division into two distinct bone beds. Since Charig's description, the Kawinga Formation has been renamed the Usili Formation, the Kingori Sandstones have become the Kingori Sandstone Member of the Manda Formation, and Charig's original Manda Formation has become a subunit of the formation called the Lifua Member. Six formations and one informal unit are currently recognized in the Songea Group (Ruhuhu basin) rocks range in age from Pennsylvanian to Anisian, including the Idusi (K1), Mchuchuma (K2), Mbuyura (K3), Mhukuru (K4), Ruhuhu (K5), and Usili (K6) formations and the informal Manda Beds, which include the Kingori Sandstone (K7) and Lifua Member (K8).

Paleobiota

Tetrapods

Temnospondyls

Parareptiles

Archosauromorphs

Archosaurs

Therapsids

Dicynodonts

Cynodonts

Age and correlations 
The upper Manda Beds have been assigned to the Perovkan LVF based on reports that Eryosuchus, Shansiodon, Angonisaurus, and Scalenodon were present. Angonisaurus does seem to tie the Manda Beds to subzone C of the Cynognathus Assemblage Zone in the Karoo Basin. However, the relations of the other Tanzanian taxa are more ambiguous. Purported Tanzanian "Eryosuchus" and "Shansiodon" specimens likely represent new genera unrelated to their supposed namesakes, while Scalenodon may be endemic to Africa due to the uncertain relations of non-African "Scalenodon" species. One Upper Manda cynodont, Aleodon, has also been found in the Dinodontosaurus assemblage zone of the Santa Maria Formation in Brazil.

See also 
 Geology of Tanzania
 Beaufort Group
 Omingonde Formation

References 

Geologic formations of Tanzania
Triassic System of Africa
Triassic Tanzania
Anisian Stage
Sandstone formations
Siltstone formations
Marl formations
Deltaic deposits
Fluvial deposits
Lacustrine deposits
Paleontology in Tanzania